Bridge Mill Farm, also known as Bridge Mill Creamery and Marshall Farm, is a historic home and farm located in East Brandywine Township, Chester County, Pennsylvania.  The farm has five contributing buildings and two contributing structures.  They are a 1 1/2-story stone grist mill dated to the late-18th century, three- to four-story banked farmhouse (1842), three level stone barn, Italianate style outhouse (1842), two-story stone and frame carriage house (c. 1890), cistern, and stone arch bridge (1903).

It was added to the National Register of Historic Places in 1983.

References

Farms on the National Register of Historic Places in Pennsylvania
Italianate architecture in Pennsylvania
Houses completed in 1842
Houses in Chester County, Pennsylvania
National Register of Historic Places in Chester County, Pennsylvania